Sam Dobkin, known by his stage name Trivecta, is an electronic dance music artist from Tampa, Florida. He has worked with record labels such as Monstercat, Thrive Music, and Ophelia Records.

Career

2014–2016: Beginnings 
Trivecta began his career by releasing the melodic dubstep song "One Night Only" featuring Yohamna Solange on April 7, 2014 with record label Monstercat.

In 2015, Trivecta began to release songs of other genres, with trance song "Evaporate" featuring Aloma Steele, and house song "Drift Away" featuring Charlotte Haining.

2017–2018: Touring 
On July 17, 2017, Trivecta released a remix of Illenium's song "Fractures". It was described by Rachel Vensand of Dancing Astronaut as a "high-energy take on Illenium’s passionate track, adding a gliding drop to the melodic original."

He toured with many artists in 2017, including Illenium, Seven Lions, Tritonal, and Kill the Noise.

On September 24, 2018, Trivecta released the melodic dubstep song "Axis" with Monstercat, described as gut wrenching, "metal crunching dubstep paired with bright synth rolls" by Chris Stack of Dancing Astronaut.

2019–2020: Ophelia Records releases 
On January 4, 2019, Trivecta released the song "Island" in collaboration with Seven Lions, Wooli, and Nevve on record label Ophelia Records, which peaked at the No. 20 position on Billboard's Dance/Electronic Digital Song Sales chart. It was described by Billboard as a "deft mix of styles and feelings" and "equal parts fantasy getaway and monstrous mood as glowing melodies soar between hard drops".

On April 24, 2020, Trivecta released his debut EP, Everyday, via Ophelia Records, which fans described as "folk bass". Rachel Kupfer of EDM.com described the extended play as an "innovative fusion of indie folk music and the melodic bass championed by the label". Harry Levin of Dancing Astronaut called it a "connection to a younger, more hopeful past" that "many people long for in their music while living through the current contemporary".

2021–2022: Debut album The Way Back Up 
On January 15, 2021, Trivecta released his first single of the year, "Twilight of the Gods", via Ophelia Records. It is a riddim dubstep song which Jessica Mao of Dancing Astronaut described as "summoning divine auras in his gargantuan coalition of stabbing synths and whipping sound design".

Two years since his last release on Monstercat, Trivecta returned to the record label on March 23, 2021 with progressive house song "Ghost in the Machine". He described the song to Dancing Astronaut as a "callback to some of the progressive house tunes I put out with Monstercat in my early years".

On June 4, 2021, Trivecta released the song "Wild and Broken" in collaboration with Seven Lions, Blanke, and RBBTS. It is Trivecta's second collaboration with Seven Lions. Matthew Meadow of Your EDM described the song with drops as "intensely happy and perfectly indicative of each artists’ ability to produce incredible, uplifting music" and an "uptempo dubstep section that chugs along to the perfect headbanging tempo".

Trivecta was featured on Ophelia Records' first tour, the Pantheon tour, on October 1, 2021 alongside artists such as Blanke, Jason Ross, Kill the Noise, and Wooli. On the same day, the record label had its 100th release, "Pantheon", a seven-artist collaboration between Blastoyz, Dimibo, Jason Ross, Kill the Noise, Seven Lions, Trivecta, and Wooli. "Pantheon" combines psytrance, riddim, and melodic dubstep, and was made over the span of a year.

On October 8, 2021, Trivecta released the song "Light Up the Sky" in collaboration with Wooli and Creed member Scott Stapp via Ophelia Records. It was described by Matthew Meadow of Your EDM as "wonderfully powerful and anthemic in every way that it should have been", and Niko Sani of EDM.com as "a story of growth and how change comes from within". It is featured on Wooli's EP Resurrection.

On February 18, 2022, Trivecta released the song "Sail Away" featuring Jay Mason, announced to be the lead single of his debut album to be released on Ophelia Records. The song was described by Stephanie Otalora of EDM Identity as an "explosive, yet beautiful track features melodic highs and gritty bass drops that are paired with the powerful, uplifting vocals of singer-songwriter, Jason May to make it truly stand out".

On March 18, 2022, Trivecta released the second single from his debut album, "Open Road" featuring Rico & Miella. Megan Schriewer of Dancing Astronaut described it as "pulling inspiration from folk music and melodic bass" and a "reflection of both Trivectas' unique production style and Rico & Miellas' grassroots background". The third and final single from the album, "Back to the Start" featuring Isaac Warburton, was released on April 8, 2022.

On May 13, 2022, Trivecta released his debut album, The Way Back Up on Ophelia Records. Niko Sani of EDM.com described the album as "encapsulating the emotive sound that helped bring him to prominence while also showcasing his ability to effortlessly flow between genres." Matthew Meadow of Your EDM described the album's genres as "the classic melodic dubstep, a bit of country/folk, some liquid drum & bass, uber wonky bass, and some heavier dubstep with psytrance." In an interview with Dancing Astronaut, Trivecta said "I didn’t actually go into it thinking, 'hey, I’m making an album'. I was just kind of like sitting around in the studio and sketching little bits of DNA, even just 15-second clips of little ideas."

Discography

Albums and extended plays

Singles

References 

Dubstep musicians
House musicians
Monstercat artists
Living people
American DJs
American record producers
American male composers
21st-century American composers
American electronic musicians
21st-century American male musicians
Year of birth missing (living people)